Werner Leimgruber (born 2 September 1934) is a Swiss football defender who played for Switzerland in the 1966 FIFA World Cup. He also played for FC Zürich.

References

External links
FIFA profile

1934 births
Swiss men's footballers
Switzerland international footballers
Association football defenders
FC Zürich players
1966 FIFA World Cup players
Living people